Hannah Arendt (14 October 1906 – 4 December 1975) was a political philosopher, author, and Holocaust survivor. She is widely considered to be one of the most influential political theorists of the 20th century.

Bibliographies 

 
 , in

Books 

 , reprinted as
  Full text on Internet Archive
 
 Also available in English as: Full text on Internet Archive 
  400 pages. (see Rahel Varnhagen)
 
 
 
 
 
 , (see also The Origins of Totalitarianism and Comparison of Nazism and Stalinism) Full text (1979 edition) on Internet Archive
 
 
  (see also The Human Condition)
 
  (see also Between Past and Future)
  (see also On Revolution) Full text on Internet Archive
  Full text: 1964 edition (see also Eichmann in Jerusalem)

Articles and essays 

  (English translation in )
  (reprinted in )
  (reprinted in )
  
  (reprinted in )
  (reprinted in )
  (English translation in )
 
 , reprinted in  
  (reprinted in

Correspondence 

 
 
 
 
 
 
 
 
 
 
 
  (excerpts)

Posthumous 

  Online text at Pensar el Espacio Público
 
 
 
 
 
 
 
  Online text; text at the Internet Archive
 
 
  Full text  on Internet Archive
 
 
  (original German transcription)
  
  
  
 
 
 
 
 
 
 
 , partly based on Was ist Politik? (1993), French translation as Qu'est-ce que la politique?
  (fragments)
  (extract)
  at Pensar el Espacio Público

Collections

Miscellaneous 

 
 
 
  (Original video)
 
 , reprinted as the Prologue in

Notes

References

Bibliography

External links 

Philosophy bibliographies
Bibliographies by writer
Bibliographies of German writers